Nancy E. Rodriguez is an American politician who has served as a Democratic member of the New Mexico Senate from the 24th District since 1996.

External links
Senator Nancy Rodriguez at the NM Senate website
Project Vote Smart - Senator Nancy E. Rodriguez (NM) profile
Follow the Money - Nancy Rodriguez
2008 2006 2004 2002 2000 1996 campaign contributions
Senator defends meeting with child assault suspect at KOAT.com

Hispanic and Latino American state legislators in New Mexico
Hispanic and Latino American women in politics
Democratic Party New Mexico state senators
Living people
Women state legislators in New Mexico
21st-century American politicians
21st-century American women politicians
1953 births